María Manuela Dominga de Espejo y Aldaz, known as Manuela de la Santa Cruz y Espejo (b. 20 December 1753 – d. 1829) was an Ecuadorian journalist, nurse, feminist, and revolutionary. She was the sister of Eugenio Espejo, with whom she discussed and shared Enlightenment and revolutionary, pro-revolutionary thought and ideas.

Biography
María Manuela Dominga de Espejo y Aldaz, the name that appears in the baptism records of La Iglesia de El Sagrario, was born on 20 December 1753 in Quito, then the capital of the Real Audiencia of the same name, part of the Spanish Empire. She was the fifth and final daughter of Luis Espejo and Catalina Aldaz, a teacher of medicines and natural sciences. Espejo married , a lawyer 22 years her junior, in the Church of El Sagrario. Their marriage was sponsored by Juan de Dios Morales and his wife, María Oleas. Despite the shared interests in independence from Spain and science, de Espejo left to work as the deputy of the Cortes of Cádiz and struck up a relationship with Gertrudis Sanalova y Benito, an Andalusian. Sanalova became de Espejo's heir universal when she died. Espejo would live next to the family of Juan de Dios Morales.

Espejo would accompany her brother Eugenio as a nurse during medical visits, and both would be present in the relief effort mounted after yellow fever struck Quito in 1785. She would care for another of her siblings, Juan Pablo de Espejo, when he became ill in 1764, putting her in the running for Ecuador's first nurse. Her medical knowledge was aided by the inheritance of Lorenzo Heinster's 26-volume encyclopedia of medicine.

Espejo wrote for a Quito newspaper under the pseudonym "Erophilia" to defend her brothers against the accusations of the Spanish government and published manifestos advocating for better treatment of women and the impoverished.

Citations

References

 

1753 births
1829 deaths
Ecuadorian journalists
Ecuadorian feminists
Ecuadorian women journalists
18th-century women writers
19th-century Ecuadorian women writers
People from Quito
Female revolutionaries